The Calcutta High Court is the oldest High Court in India. It is located at Esplanade Row West, Kolkata, West Bengal. It has jurisdiction over the state of West Bengal and the Union Territory of the Andaman and Nicobar Islands. The High Court building's design is somewhat based on the Cloth Hall, Ypres, in Belgium. It is the oldest high court in India.

Currently, the court has a sanctioned judge strength of 72.

History

The Calcutta High Court is one of the three High Courts in India established at the Presidency Towns by Letters patent granted by Queen Victoria, bearing date 26 June 1862, and is the oldest High Court in India. It was established as the High Court of Judicature at Fort William on 1 July 1862 under the High Courts Act, 1861, which was preceded by the Supreme Court of Judicature at Fort William. The building structure was designed by Walter Long Bozzi Granville.

Despite the name of the city having officially changed from Calcutta to Kolkata in 2001, the Court, as an institution retained the old name. The bill to rename it as Kolkata High Court was approved by the Union Cabinet on 5 July 2016 along with the renaming of its two other counterparts in Chennai and Mumbai. The Bill called High Courts (Alternation of Names) Bill was introduced in the Lok Sabha on 19 July 2016  and is yet to be passed by both Houses of Parliament. Hence, the High Court still retains the old name.

Principal seat and benches
The seat of the Calcutta High Court is at Kolkata, capital of West Bengal. As per the Calcutta High Court (Extension of Jurisdiction) Act, 1953, the Calcutta High Court's jurisdiction was extended to cover Chandernagore (now called Chandannagar) and the Andaman and Nicobar Islands as of 2 May 1950.  The Calcutta High Court extended its Circuit Bench in Port Blair, the capital of the Andaman and Nicobar Islands and in Jalpaiguri, the divisional headquarters of the North Bengal region. On 7 February 2019, President Ram Nath Kovind finalised the opening of the other circuit bench in Jalpaiguri, West Bengal with the jurisdiction area within 5 districts- Darjeeling, Kalimpong, Jalpaiguri, Alipurduar and Cooch Behar.

Chief Justice
The current Chief Justice of the court is Justice Prakash Shrivastava.

Sir Barnes Peacock was the first Chief Justice of the High Court. He assumed the charge when the court was founded on 1 July 1862. Justice Romesh Chandra Mitra was the first Indian officiating Chief Justice and Justice Phani Bhushan Chakravartti was the first Indian permanent Chief Justice of the court. The longest-serving Chief Justice was Justice Sankar Prasad Mitra.

List of Chief Justices
For Chief Justices of the previous Supreme Court of Bengal see Supreme Court of Judicature at Fort William.

Judges 
The court has a Sanctioned strength of 72 (Permanent:54, Additional:18) judges.

Judges Elevated to the Supreme Court of India-

Judges Transferred/Elevated from the Calcutta High Court-

Sitting Judges of Calcutta High Court-

Building
The neo-Gothic High Court building was constructed in 1872, ten years after the establishment of the court itself.
The design, by then government architect Walter Granville, was loosely modelled on the 13th-century Cloth Hall at Ypres, Belgium.
In 1977 another building named High Court Centenary Building or annexed building was inaugurated to reduce the pressure.

Connectivity

Rails
Eden Gardens railway station is the nearest railway station, which is 650 meters away from the court. Esplanade metro station, the nearest rapid rail transit is 1.3 km away.

References

External links
 
 Official website
 Former official website (archived 6 March 2007)
 Judge strength in High Courts increased

Organisations based in Kolkata
Tourist attractions in Kolkata
Buildings and structures in Kolkata
Gothic Revival architecture in India
1862 establishments in India
Legal history of India
 
Judiciary of India
Courts and tribunals established in 1862